The 2022 Women's Africa Cup of Nations Final was an association football match played between Morocco and South Africa at Prince Moulay Abdellah Stadium in Rabat, Morocco on 23rd July 2022 and the 14th final of the biennial international women's football tournament organized by CAF.

The first final in the history of the competition to feature neither the 11-time winners and defending champions Nigeria nor 2-time host-nation winners Equatorial Guinea, South Africa claimed its inaugural title at the 6th attempt with a 2–1 win against host nation Morocco. Prior to this final, the men's national teams of Morocco and South Africa already faced each other in a qualification match for the 2023 Africa Cup of Nations at the same stadium, which Morocco won 2–1.

Background
The 2022 Women's Africa Cup of Nations was the 14th edition of the biennial premier women's tournament in the CAF calendar which was held from 2 to 23 July 2022 in two cities in Morocco, who became the first North African host nation of the tournament.

The qualification process began on 18 October 2021 and concluded 23 February 2022, with 44 out of the 54 CAF countries vying for the final tournament spots through matches played on a home-and-away two-legged basis. The away goals rule was applied to aggregate scores which were level after the second leg, with no extra time and straight to penalty shoot-outs to determine the winner. At the final tournament, there was an increase in team participation than the previous edition in 2018, with 12 teams divided into 3 groups of 4 than the previous 8 teams divided into 2 groups of 4. Also, there was an addition of the quarter-finals at the knockout stages with the two best 3rd-placed teams joining the already-exiting top-2 teams in each group. These final tournament changes would have come to effect at the supposed-to-be 14th edition in 2020, but the COVID-19 pandemic in Africa had led CAF to the cancel it and rather approve the creation of this tournament's football club version.

Venue

The final was held at the 53,000-capacity multi-purpose Prince Moulay Abdellah Stadium in the capital city of Rabat, which previously hosted the 2019 African Games and was one of two stadiums used for the 1988 African Cup of Nations along with the Casablanca-based high-infrastructure larger-capacity Stade Mohammed V.

Road to the final

Morocco
Having failed to qualify for any of previous editions of WAFCON since 2000, the country was awarded the hosting rights of the 2022 edition on 15 January 2021, effectively qualifying their women's national team automatically for the tournament, making Morocco the first North African host nation of the tournament.

Prior to its unveiling as the host nation, Morocco had only participated in two editions; in 1998 where they performed well but were heavily defeated by Nigeria at the quarter-final stage and in 2000 where it was the exact opposite with a bottom-place finish with a single goal scored. As the host nation, Morocco got placed in Pot 1 and getting seeded alongside women's continental powerhouse and defending champions Nigeria and Cameroon. They were drawn in Group A alongside Burkina Faso, Senegal and Uganda. In a relatively easier group with a single tournament edition appearance between their group opponents and having successfully avoided the previous edition's participants, Zambia and South Africa, Morocco topped the group in style, winning all three group games with 5 goals scored and only 1 conceded. In the quarter-finals, Morocco won 2–1 against debutant minnows and surprise package, Botswana, to qualify for the semi-finals and become the first country from North Africa and the Arab world to qualify for the 2023 FIFA Women's World Cup Morocco continued the pursuit of the first North African nation to reach the final defeated 9-women 11-time defending champions Nigeria 5–4 on penalties following a 1–1 draw after the regulation 120 minutes.

South Africa
One of Africa's most traditional women's football teams, South Africa, come into their 6th final having reached this stage 5 times previously and lost all of them, with the 2018 final being their most recent where they lost to eventual champions Nigeria on penalties. South Africa entered the qualification rounds with a 13–0 aggregate win against with Mozambique and beat Algeria 3–1 on aggregate to qualify for the final tournament in Morocco. However, because of poorer FIFA ranking, South Africa was not among the seeded teams in the final draw, finding itself in Group C alongside Nigeria and two debutants, Burundi and Botswana.

South Africa began the quest for the elusive first title win by beating the defending champions Nigeria 2–1, 3–1 against Burundi and 1–0 against Botswana to top the group with perfect nine points. In the knockout stage, South Africa beat Tunisia 1–0 despite dominating the game to qualify for both the semi-finals and the 2023 FIFA Women's World Cup. South Africa then had to rely on a second half's injury time penalty to overcome the emerging African women's force Zambia 1–0 in the semi-finals to progress to its 6th and back-to-back final.

Match

Details

Aftermath
Following the final and at the 6th attempt, South Africa became the 3rd country after Nigeria and Equatorial Guinea to win the title and join Nigeria as the only countries to have won both the male and female AFCONs despite the loss of talisman Thembi Kgatlana to injury.

The successful participation of Morocco as the host nation despite defeat was considered as a watershed moment for women's football in North Africa and the Arab world in general, as women have long suffered from gender discrimination and neglect by their various governments. Prior to the final, the country's incredible tournament form received widespread acclaim for becoming the first Arab country to qualify for the FIFA Women's World Cup. In addition, fan atmosphere and attendance in the final helped elevate the status of the Moroccan women's team.

The final was attended by the president of CAF, South African Football Association and Royal Moroccan Football Federation (FRMF), Dr. Patrice Motsepe, Danny Jordaan and Fouzi Lekjaa respectively. Various African male and female legends also attended the final. For the female legends, there were four-time African Women's Footballer of the Year Perpetua Nkwocha and past winners including Mercy Akide (2001), Alberta Sackey (2002), Adjoa Bayor (2003), Genoveva Añonma (2012), Gaelle Enganamouit (2015) and Ajara Nchout Njoya. The male legends including Samuel Eto'o, Kalusha Bwalya, Lucas Radebe, Jay-Jay Okocha, Wael Gomaa, El Hadji Diouf and Emmanuel Adebayor were also in attendance. Following the final, Motsepe declared that the final "will change women's football forever".

References

External links

2022 Women's Africa Cup of Nations
Women's Africa Cup of Nations tournaments
2023 FIFA Women's World Cup qualification
2022 in African football
2022 in women's association football
2022 in Moroccan sport
International association football competitions hosted by Morocco
Africa Cup of Nations Final
Association football events curtailed due to the COVID-19 pandemic